Hüseyin Sermet (born in Istanbul, 1955) is a Turkish pianist and composer. He is a Doctor Honoris Causa by the Boğaziçi (1988) and Marmara (1998) universities, and was named a State Artist in 1991. He is Co-President of ADAP (Association of Artists for Peace), based in Paris.

References

External links
 Profile at the 2003 Year if Turkey in Japan webpage
 https://www.adapinternational.org/
https://huseyinsermet.com

State Artists of Turkey
Living people
1955 births
Turkish classical pianists
Prize-winners of the Paloma O'Shea International Piano Competition
José Iturbi International Piano Competition prize-winners
International Ettore Pozzoli Piano Competition prize-winners
21st-century classical pianists
Prize-winners of the Queen Elisabeth Competition